The 1897 Tennessee Volunteers football team represented the University of Tennessee in the 1897 Southern Intercollegiate Athletic Association football season. The 1897 Volunteers were the fifth official Tennessee team to take the field. This was also their second season in the Southern Intercollegiate Athletic Association (SIAA). They played five games and won four.

Schedule

References

Tennessee
Tennessee Volunteers football seasons
Tennessee Volunteers football